Rembert is a town in Sumter County, South Carolina, United States. The population was 306 at the 2010 census, a decline from 406 in 2000. It is included in the Sumter, South Carolina Metropolitan Statistical Area.

History
Ellerbe's Mill was listed on the National Register of Historic Places in 1974.

Geography

According to the United States Census Bureau, the CDP has a total area of 4.4 square miles (11.4 km2), all land. It is named after Huguenot Frenchman, Andre Rembert (1661-1736), immigrant to South Carolina.

Demographics

As of the census of 2000, there were 406 people, 144 households, and 101 families residing in the CDP. The population density was 92.1 people per square mile (35.5/km2). There were 163 housing units at an average density of 37.0/sq mi (14.3/km2). The racial makeup of the CDP was 24.14% White, 75.62% African American, 0.25% from other races. Hispanic or Latino of any race were 1.48% of the population.

There were 144 households, out of which 32.6% had children under the age of 18 living with them, 37.5% were married couples living together, 25.0% had a female householder with no husband present, and 29.2% were non-families. 24.3% of all households were made up of individuals, and 6.9% had someone living alone who was 65 years of age or older. The average household size was 2.82 and the average family size was 3.42.

In the CDP, the population was spread out, with 33.5% under the age of 18, 9.4% from 18 to 24, 26.6% from 25 to 44, 18.5% from 45 to 64, and 12.1% who were 65 years of age or older. The median age was 33 years. For every 100 females, there were 82.9 males. For every 100 females age 18 and over, there were 75.3 males.

The median income for a household in the CDP was $18,958, and the median income for a family was $25,417. Males had a median income of $19,911 versus $16,875 for females. The per capita income for the CDP was $9,528. About 26.5% of families and 30.8% of the population were below the poverty line, including 44.2% of those under age 18 and 51.3% of those age 65 or over.

References

Census-designated places in Sumter County, South Carolina
Census-designated places in South Carolina